Cranston is a Scottish surname.

Cranston may also refer to:

Place names
Scotland
Cranston, Midlothian
Canada
Cranston, Calgary, neighbourhood in Calgary, Alberta
United States
Cranston, Iowa
Cranston, Rhode Island